was a town located in Aira District, Kagoshima Prefecture, Japan.

As of 2003, the town had an estimated population of 4,818 and the density of 88.44 persons per km2. The total area was 54.48 km2.

On March 22, 2005, Yoshimatsu, along with the town of Kurino (also from Aira District), was merged to create the town of Yūsui and no longer exists as an independent municipality.

External links

Dissolved municipalities of Kagoshima Prefecture
Yūsui, Kagoshima